The 1950–51 Serie C was the thirteenth edition of Serie C, the third highest league in the Italian football league system.

Legend

Girone A

Girone B

Girone C

Girone D

Serie C seasons
3
Italy